Hibbertia depressa is a species of flowering plant in the family Dilleniaceae and is endemic to the far south-west of Western Australia. It is a prostrate or sprawling shrub with spreading, usually densely clustered, linear leaves and yellow flowers arranged singly or clustered among the leaves.

Description
Flowering has been recorded from September to February.

Taxonomy
Hibbertia depressa was first formally described by the botanist Ernst Gottlieb von Steudel in 1845 in Johann Georg Christian Lehmann's Plantae Preissianae. The specific epithet (depressa) means "pressed down", referring to the low habit of the plant.

Distribution and habitat
This hibbertia commonly grows in jarrah woodland, sometimes in coastal shrubland and is found between the Kent River, Nanarup and Mount Barker in the Avon Wheatbelt, Jarrah Forest and Warren biogeographic regions in the far south-west of Western Australia.

Conservation status
Hibbertia depressa is classified as "not threatened" by the Government of Western Australia Department of Parks and Wildlife.

See also
List of Hibbertia species

References

depressa
Flora of Western Australia
Plants described in 1845